Meghamalhar is a 2001 Indian Malayalam-language romance film written and directed by Kamal from a story by Iqbal Kuttippuram. It stars Biju Menon and Samyuktha Varma in the lead roles, while Poornima Mohan, Sreenath, Shivaji, Siddique and Raghavan plays supporting roles. The film was jointly produced by M. V. Shreyams Kumar for Mathrubhumi and Asianet. The film won two Kerala State Film Awards and two Filmfare Awards South. The movie was reported to be inspired by the 1945 British movie Brief Encounter.

Plot
The film is the story of Rajeevan, an advocate and Nandita Menon, a writer. Rajeevan is married to Rekha, a bank employee, and has two kids. Nandita is married to Mukundan, a businessman in the Gulf, and has a daughter. Both meet each other accidentally and in due course their relationship becomes intimate (Mentally). Their tastes and thinking are almost alike.

Megha Malhar movie tells Nandita who is a budding writer who works with a leading newspaper and Rajeevan an attorney. They lead their normal family life happily. A mix-up in the cakes they ordered for their respective kids introduce the protagonists and their background.

Then they meet again, and again. When Rajeev narrates an incident in his childhood bearing uncanny resemblance to Nandita’s short story, she realizes he is her childhood friend on whose shoulders she leaned on in times of distress.

A chemistry develops between them and Rajeev mistakes this to be love and expresses his feelings to her. She responds predictably and tries to alienate him, ignoring him. But later she gifts her book  "Megha Malhar" to him, revealing that she is his childhood friend.

Rajeev agrees never to meet her afterwards and meet her for the last time. They travel together to Kanyakumari where they had spent their childhood together and they decide to part their ways and live as strangers.

Towards the autumn of one's life, they met again as strangers.

Cast

Soundtrack
Lyrics were by O. N. V. Kurup and Nazim Akhtar. Music was by Ramesh Narayan and Jithesh (Rangathu).

 "Oru Narupushpamaayi" (M) - K. J. Yesudas
 "Oru Narupushpamaayi" (F) - K. S. Chitra, Ramesh Narayan
 "Ponnushassennum" - P. Jayachandran, K. S. Chitra
 "Rangathu" - Jithesh

Awards
Filmfare Awards South
 Best Actress - Malayalam - Samyuktha Varma
 Best Film - Malayalam - M. V. Shreyams Kumar

Kerala State Film Awards
 Second Best Film - Meghamalhar
 Best Screenplay - Kamal

Kerala Film Critics' Awards
 Best Film - Meghamalhar
 Best Screenplay - Kamal

Asianet Film Awards
 Best Film - Meghamalhar
 Best Director - Kamal
 Best Actress - Samyuktha Varma
 Best Star Pair - Biju Menon and Samyuktha Varma
 Best Cinematographer - Venugopal
 Best Editing - Beena Paul

 Others
 Ramu Kariyat Award for Best Director - Kamal

References

External links
 
 Mehgamalhar at the Malayalam Movie Database

2000s Malayalam-language films
2000s romantic musical films
Indian romantic musical films
Films directed by Kamal (director)